Video editing is the manipulation and arrangement of video shots. Video editing is used to structure and present all video information, including films and television shows, video advertisements and video essays. Video editing has been dramatically democratized in recent years by editing software available for personal computers. Editing video can be difficult and tedious, so several technologies have been produced to aid people in this task. Pen based video editing software was developed in order to give people a more intuitive and fast way to edit video.

Types of editing
Though once the province of expensive machines called video editors, video editing software is now available for personal computers and workstations. Video editing includes cutting segments (trimming), re-sequencing clips, and adding transitions and other special effects.

 Linear video editing uses video tape and is edited in a very linear way. Several video clips from different tapes are recorded to one single tape in the order that they will appear.
Non-linear editing systems (NLE) allow video to be edited on computers with specialized software. This process is not destructive to the raw video footage and is done by using programs such as DaVinci Resolve, Avid Media Composer, Adobe Premiere Pro and Final Cut Pro.
 Offline editing is the process by which raw footage is copied from an original source, without affecting the original film stock or video tape. Once the editing is complete, the original media is then re-assembled in the online editing stage.
 Online editing is the process of reassembling the edit to full resolution video after an offline edit has been performed. It is done in the final stage of a video production.
 Cloud-based editing is the process of utilising the internet to work with content remotely, collaboratively or of a time-critical nature such as editing of live sports events in real-time using video proxies (lower resolution copies) of original material.
 Vision mixing is used when working within live television and video production environments. A vision mixer is used to cut live feed coming from several cameras in real time.

Background
Video editing is the process of editing segments of motion video production footage, special effects and sound recordings in the post-production process. Motion picture film editing is a predecessor to video editing and, in several ways, video editing simulates motion picture film editing, in theory and the use of linear video editing and video editing software on non-linear editing systems (NLE). Using video, a director can communicate non-fictional and fictional events. The goal of editing is to manipulate these events to bring the communication closer to the original goal or target. It is a visual art.

Early 1950s video tape recorders (VTR) were so expensive, and the quality degradation caused by copying was so great, that a 2-inch Quadruplex videotape was edited by visualizing the recorded track with ferrofluid, cutting it with a razor blade or guillotine cutter, and splicing with video tape. The two pieces of tape to be joined were painted with a solution of extremely fine iron filings suspended in carbon tetrachloride, a toxic and carcinogenic compound. This "developed" the magnetic tracks, making them visible when viewed through a microscope so that they could be aligned in a splicer designed for this task.
     
Improvements in quality and economy, and the invention of the flying erase-head, allowed new video and audio material to be recorded over the material already present on an existing magnetic tape. This was introduced into the linear editing technique. If a scene closer to the beginning of the video tape needed to be changed in length, all later scenes would need to be recorded onto the video tape again in sequence. In addition, sources could be played back simultaneously through a vision mixer (video switcher) to create more complex transitions between scenes. A popular 1970-80s system for creating these transitions was the U-matic equipment (named for the U-shaped tape path). That system used two tape players and one tape recorder, and edits were done by automatically having the machines back up, then speed up together simultaneously, so that the edit didn't roll or glitch. Later, in the 1980-90's came the smaller beta equipment (named for the B-shaped tape path), and more complex controllers, some of which did the synchronizing electronically.

There was a transitional analog period using multiple source videocassette recorders (VCR) with the Montage Picture Processor and Ediflex, or EditDroid using LaserDisc players, but modern NLE systems edit video digitally captured onto a hard drive from an analog video or digital video source. Content is ingested and recorded natively with the appropriate codec that the video editing software uses to process captured footage. High-definition video is becoming more popular and can be readily edited using the same video editing software along with related motion graphics programs. Video clips are arranged on a timeline, music tracks, titles, digital on-screen graphics are added, special effects can be created, and the finished program is "rendered" into a finished video. The video may then be distributed in a variety of ways including DVD, web streaming, QuickTime Movies, iPod, CD-ROM, or video tape.

Home video editing 
Like some other technologies, the cost of video editing has declined over time. The original 2" Quadruplex system cost so much that many television production facilities could only afford a single unit, and editing was a highly involved process that required special training. In contrast to this, nearly any home computer sold since the year 2000 has the speed and storage capacity to digitize and edit standard-definition television (SDTV). The two major retail operating systems include basic video editing software – Apple's iMovie and Microsoft's Windows Movie Maker. Additional options exist, usually as more advanced commercial products. As well as these commercial products, there are open-source video-editing programs. Automatic video editing products have also emerged, opening up video editing to a broader audience of amateurs and reducing the time it takes to edit videos. These exist usually as media storage services, such as Google with its Google Photos or smaller companies like Vidify.

Applications 
Video editing can be used for many purposes such as education, entertainment, and documentation.

Virtual reality—Advancements are being made to help with editing spherical video used in virtual reality settings. The ability to edit in virtual reality was created so that users would be able to check their video edits in real time, without having to continually view the video in a headset between edits.
Social media—Video editing can be used for entertainment and other purposes on YouTube and other social media sites. School teachers have used video editing to help their students retain information and extend lessons outside the classroom.

See also
 Edit decision list
 Video mashups
 Photo slideshow software
 Video scratching
 Video manipulation
 Video server
 List of video editing software
 Comparison of video editing software

References

External links

Film and video technology
Film editing